San Juje Da Areal railway station is a small railway station in South Goa district, Goa. Its code is SJDA. It serves Curtorim village. The station consists of one platform. The platform is now sheltered. Now it has facilities ilike water  sanitation.

Major trains 

 Vasco da Gama–Kulem Passenger

References

Hubli railway division
Railway stations in South Goa district